Andra Atteberry (born April 8, 1943) is an American politician in the state of Iowa. A Democrat, she served in the Iowa House of Representatives from 2001 to 2003 as the representative for the 27th district.

Early life 
Atteberry was born on April 8, 1943, in Fort Sill, Oklahoma. She attended Southern Illinois University where she received a bachelors of science degree in education. She served as chair of the Delaware County Democratic Central Committee. She is married to Duane and the couple have two sons.

She was a member of the Delaware County YWCA Domestic Violence Program Board, the United Methodist Church, the Manchester chapter of the General Federation of Women's Clubs, the P.E.O. Sisterhood and the Farm Bureau. She works as a freelance writer.

Political career 
Atteberry was first elected to the Iowa House of Representatives in the 2000 general election, serving as the representative for the 27th district. She was a member of the committees for agriculture, economic growth and human resources. She served in office between January 8, 2001, and January 12, 2003.

References

1943 births
Living people
People from Fort Sill, Oklahoma
People from Delaware County, Iowa
Southern Illinois University alumni
Women state legislators in Iowa
Democratic Party members of the Iowa House of Representatives
People from Manchester, Iowa
Writers from Iowa
21st-century American women politicians
21st-century American politicians
Politicians from Oklahoma